Minae may refer to:

Mina (unit), ancient unit of mass
 Minaeans, the inhabitants of the kingdom of Ma'in in modern-day Yemen.

People:
Minae of Silla (died 839), Silla ruler
 (born 1951), Japanese writer and literary critic
Minae Noji (born 1973), Japanese-American actress

See also
Ministry of Environment, Energy and Telecommunications, government ministry of Costa Rica

Japanese feminine given names